Axinoptera curviscapulis is a moth in the family Geometridae occurring in the north-eastern Himalayas.

References

Moths described in 1958
Eupitheciini
Moths of Asia